The 2013 EBSA European Under-21 Snooker Championships was an amateur snooker tournament that took place from 18 March to 22 March 2013 in Bor  Serbia  It was the 17th edition of the EBSA European Under-21 Snooker Championships and also doubles as a qualification event for the World Snooker Tour.

The tournament was won by 14th seed James Cahill who defeated fellow Englishman Ashley Carty 6–0 in the final, becoming the only player to win the final by a whitewash in the tournaments history. As a result, Cahill was given a two-year card on the professional World Snooker Tour for the 2013/2014 and 2014/2015 seasons.

Results

Round 1
Best of 7 frames

References

2013 in snooker
Snooker amateur tournaments
Bor District
2013 in Serbian sport
International sports competitions hosted by Serbia
Sport in Southern and Eastern Serbia